WCHO (1250 AM) is a radio station broadcasting an oldies format. Licensed to Washington Court House, Ohio, United States, the station is currently owned by iHeartMedia, Inc., through licensee iHM Licenses, LLC, and features programming from iHeartMedia's Premium Choice "Cool Oldies" format. Likewise, the station's branding varies between "Cool Oldies" and "Classic Hits."

History

The station went on the air as WCHO in February 1952. It became WOFR on June 27, 1983, then changed its call sign to WBUB on April 17, 1998, then back to WCHO on January 18, 1999, then to WMXV on November 5, 1999, then back to WCHO on October 23, 2000, then to WKSI on March 26, 2002, and back to the current WCHO on December 24, 2003.

References

External links

CHO
Radio stations established in 1952
1952 establishments in Ohio
IHeartMedia radio stations